The Burkina Faso Davis Cup team represents Burkina Faso in Davis Cup tennis competition and are governed by the Fédération Burkinabé de Tennis.  They have not competed since 2003.

History
Burkina Faso competed in its first Davis Cup in 2001.  Their best result was second in their Group IV pool in 2003.

Last team (2003) 

 Sansan Dabire (Captain-player)
 Mamadou Kabore
 Kadre Nanema

See also
Davis Cup

External links

Davis Cup teams
Davis Cup
Davis Cup